Cintia Frencia (born 18 May 1987) is a former member of the provincial legislature in Córdoba Province, Argentina.

She is a member of the Workers' Party (Argentina), and was elected as a candidate of the Workers' Left Front.

She held the post in rotation, taking over from Liliana Olivero in December 2013, and handing over to Laura Vilches in December 2014.

She previously studied at the National University of Córdoba.

External links 
article (Spanish) 
interview (Spanish)

Defensa de la banca del FIT (Spanish)

Living people
Workers' Party (Argentina) politicians
21st-century Argentine women politicians
21st-century Argentine politicians
Politicians from Córdoba, Argentina
1987 births
National University of Córdoba alumni